The Sleep Curse is a Hong Kong horror film directed by Herman Yau. It alternates between 1942 and 1990, between a family, with neuroscientist Lam Sik-ka (Anthony Wong), and his father Lam Sing (also by Wong), who was a translator for the Japanese occupational forces in Hong Kong. Sing has hidden the fact that in his past, he did not save a comfort woman (Michelle Wai) from persecution by the occupiers. Sik-ka later learns that his father's death was caused by a curse the woman placed on him, and that the curse will eventually haunt him as well.

Wong announced that The Sleep Curse would be his last performance in horror and thriller films, stating he no longer enjoyed making them.

Themes
At the Far East Film Festival in Udine, Erica Li spoke about the themes of the film, stating that the film was to "speak for the women, [...] Especially for those who cannot speak for themselves, like the victims of the war. This topic was trying to tell the world that some justice is still undone."

Release
The Sleep Curse had its premiere at the Hong Kong International Film Festival in 2017. It had a wide release in Hong Kong on May 18, 2017.

Reception
The Hollywood Reporter compared the film to director Herman Yau and Anthony Wong's previous collaborations The Untold Story and The Ebola Syndrome, stating that "There may be no way for the film's director and star to regenerate the manic energy and social fury that made The Untold Story and The Ebola Syndrome such genre-benders more than two decades ago." noting Wong strives for depth in the role, while Yau "struggles to rein in all the sprawling elements — the nondimensional characters, the visceral violence, Brother Hung's bombastic music — into a tight, coherent movie." The South China Morning Post gave the film a two and a half star rating out of five, noting the screenwriters placed "excessively long flashbacks to explain the origin of the curse" and that "The film only snaps back to life with an avalanche of decapitation, mutilation and cannibalism in its last reel. For those expecting a gory good time throughout, as in Yau’s extreme horror classics from the ’90s, that is too little, too late."

References

External links
 

Films set in 1990
2017 films
2017 horror films
Hong Kong supernatural horror films
Hong Kong horror films
Films directed by Herman Yau
2010s Hong Kong films